Asafu is both a given name and surname. Notable people with the name include:

 Asafu Tembo, Zambian judoka
 Kwame Asafu Adjei (born 1950), Ghanaian politician
 Ed Asafu-Adjaye (born 1988), English footballer
 Edward Asafu-Adjaye (1903–1976), Ghanaian political figure, lawyer, and diplomat

See also
Asaf